The Jackson County Courthouse, located at 413 4th Street in the city of Jackson, Jackson County in the U.S. state of Minnesota consists of a Bedford limestone Beaux Arts courthouse featuring a high, segmented dome adorned with a cast statue of Lady Justice, columns supporting a gable overhang, a shield pediment, and symmetrical pavilions.

The building was built by Charles Skooglun of Saint Paul at a cost $117,435 in 1908-1909. The imposing structure is topped by a two-plus-story dome with stained glass windows.  This sits over an octagonal atrium with terrazzo floors, marbled plaster walls, and a second-floor courtroom painted by immigrants with extensive murals; they depict scenes such as a frontier cabin, a railroad, Romans engaged in engineering and construction, and three women (justice, liberty, and equality) guarding a judge's bench.

References

External links

Beaux-Arts architecture in Minnesota
Buildings and structures in Jackson County, Minnesota
County courthouses in Minnesota
Courthouses on the National Register of Historic Places in Minnesota
Government buildings completed in 1909
National Register of Historic Places in Jackson County, Minnesota